Amos Pizzey (born 1967) is a British businessman and the founder of internet company Talenthouse.

Early life
Amos Pizzey was born in West London in 1967. His mother Erin Pizzey was the founder of the Women's Refugee Movement, now known as Refuge.

Music career
He began his career in music at the age of 13, and was recognized for his vocal talent by Boy George. At the age of 14, he joined George’s band, Culture Club, using the name Captain Crucial and toasted on the Kissing To Be Clever song Love Twist as well as Murder Rap Trap, the B-side to I'm Afraid Of Me (also included on the album's 2003 reissue as a bonus track). Two years later, he signed his first international contract with Richard Branson at Virgin Records. Over the next two decades, Pizzey signed with various record labels and was also producing and remixing music for artists such as Madonna, George Michael, Red Hot Chili Peppers, and Boy George (toasting on various remixes of his song Everything I Own). He also toured with Boy George's other band, Jesus Loves You, and performed on their singles Generations of Love and Sweet Toxic Love. It was during this time that he forged a close relationship with English DJ and singer Jeremy Healy. The two had a series of hit records  and created the multi-platform entertainment concept known as Bleachin', which tells the story of inner city club culture through film, fashion, art, music and photography. Pizzey and Healy went on to sign the project with BMG Records, and were consequently photographed by Annie Leibovitz for American Vogue at the request of fashion designer John Galliano. In the year 2000, Pizzey became a founding partner of London’s Met Bar, which became popular with artists.

Advertising career
In 2005, Pizzey was asked by the CEO of advertising agency Saatchi & Saatchi to serve as the founder and creative director of GUM (Global Urban Media) at the agency. GUM was one of the first branded content companies inside an international advertising agency connecting the youth market with global brands and entertainment Icons. During his three-year tenure, Pizzey worked with corporations Procter & Gamble, Atlantic Records, Diageo and Microsoft and was responsible for developing numerous multi-platform brand campaigns as well as brokering entertainment and advertising deals.

Talenthouse
In 2009 he relocated to the California where he founded Talenthouse, described as ‘The World's Open Source Creative Department’, which was initially located in Palo Alto before moving to Los Angeles. Talenthouse is a computing platform that hosts open source creative briefs that generate creative content at scale for its clients while providing opportunities for creators.  Campaigns have involved artists including U2, Paul McCartney, Tom Ford, Dolce and Gabbana, Luc Besson, Naomi Campbell, Lady Gaga and Dr. Dre and for marketers such as Adidas, Intel, Airbnb, Vice Media, Macy’s, Time Inc, Universal Music Group, Fox Films, Warner Bros and Microsoft. 
As Founder, Creative Director and Board Member, Pizzey helped broker partnerships with brands and artists and raise $30 million in funding. Pizzey left Talenthouse in 2016.

Personal life
Pizzey is married to British radio and television presenter Lisa l'Anson; they live in Los Angeles, and have two children.

References

External links
Talenthouse.com

1967 births
Living people
Singers from London
Businesspeople from London
English emigrants to the United States
Businesspeople from Los Angeles